is a Japanese manga written and illustrated by Kōji Seo. It was serialized in Kodansha's Weekly Shōnen Magazine from February 2014 to April 2018, with its chapters collected in twenty tankōbon volumes. It is a sequel to Seo's previous manga series Suzuka. It was published online in English by Crunchyroll.

A 12-episode anime television adaptation produced by Diomedéa aired from January to March 2017.

Plot

Fuuka is a sequel to the 2004 manga Suzuka. The story follows Yuu Haruna, a loner and an avid Twitter user that made a promise with his childhood friend Koyuki Hinashi of starting a band. One night, on his way to buy dinner, he stops to take a photo to upload to Twitter. A strange high school girl named Fuuka Akitsuki accidentally bumps into him and mistakenly believes that Yuu is trying to take a photo of her panties, which causes her to smash his phone. Fuuka leaves behind a CD, which Yuu returns the following day. Appreciating Yuu's personality, Fuuka starts a relationship with him, but this is complicated when Koyuki, now a popular idol, contacts Yuu on Twitter and invites him to attend her concert. Fuuka and Yuu begin their music careers when they form a new band called The Fallen Moon together with classmates Makoto, Kazuya, and Sara. Meanwhile, Fuuka's feelings towards Yuu continue to grow, while Koyuki also begins to get closer to him.

Characters

Main characters

Yuu is bassist of the band The Fallen Moon (later renamed Blue Wells). After transferring to a school in Tokyo, he meets Fuuka Akitsuki, a mysterious woman who does not have a cellphone. At her request, they form a band, which later performs at their school's school festival.

Fuuka is the heroine of the series, and the daughter of the main characters of Seo's previous manga Suzuka. Yuu initially meets Fuuka after an incident where she accuses him of taking a peek at her panties. Later on, she decides to form a band with Yuu, which is named "The Fallen Moon" after her surname, and becomes the band's vocalist. They successfully perform at their school's school festival. Her fate is different between the manga and the anime adaptation. In the manga, she dies in an accident after she is hit by a truck. In the anime, the truck stops before it could hit her. The anime ends with Fuuka going out with Yuu.

Generally referred to as Aoi to distinguish her from Fuuka Akitsuki, she is a budding musician who originally came from Izu, Shizuoka. After performing at a battle-of-the-bands competition, she later performs together with The Fallen Moon at a music festival organized by the band Hedgehogs. Following this, Aoi requests that she join The Fallen Moon. It is later revealed that her father was the driver of the truck which killed Akitsuki. She falls for him later on in the series and begins to date him in chapter 146 after playing the song he wrote for her expressing his feelings.

Koyuki is Yuu's childhood friend and a popular singer. Following an incident where she and Yuu are seen in public together, she confesses her love for him on national television. After retiring as a solo musician, she secretly forms the band Rabbitz, whose members wear rabbit heads during performances. By the end of the manga, she disbands Rabbitz and becomes the new lead vocalist of the Hedgehogs.

The Fallen Moon

Makoto is the keyboardist of the Blue Wells music band. He is well-liked by his fellow female schoolmates and girls in general. He has won piano competitions in the past. He initially thinks of himself as gay, but realizes he is bisexual after falling in love with his teacher Tomomi.

Kazuya is the drummer of the band. At first relentless at trying to recruit Fuuka to their school's track and field team, he later becomes the "leader" of the music band. He later develops feelings for Sara.

Sara is a student at Yuu and Fuuka's school, and the younger sister of Hisashi, Hedgehogs' guitarist. Like Hisa, Sara plays the guitar. She is actually Yuu's online friend, one of the very few people he was comfortable talking to before he met Fuuka. Upon realizing this, she develops a crush on him.

Haruna family

Yuu's eldest sister who works at an advertising agency.

Yuu's other older sister who attends college.

Yuu's younger sister who is attending middle school.

Akitsuki family

Fuuka Akitsuki's mother, the titular heroine of Suzuka and a former track and field athlete.

Fuuka Akitsuki's father, the protagonist of Suzuka and a former track and field athlete.

Fuuka Akitsuki's younger sister, around 8-9 years old. In contrast to Fuuka (who resembles her mother), Haruka resembles her father.

Hedgehogs

 is Yuu and Fuuka's homeroom teacher. It is later revealed that she is the former keyboardist of the band Hedgehogs, Yuu and Fuuka's favorite band. She later becomes Makoto's girlfriend.

He is the former guitarist of the Hedgehogs. He runs a music studio and is Sara's older brother.

He is the former drummer for the Hedgehogs, who now runs the "South Wind" Beach House.

 is the former vocalist for the Hedgehogs. At the end of the series, she and Nico marry.

 is the former bass player for the Hedgehogs.

Others

Koyuki's manager.

Mogami is a music producer for young artists.

A character who Yuu meets in the manga. She bears a striking resemblance to Fuuka. It is later revealed that she was a classmate of Yuu and Fuuka who had moved to Fukuoka and changed her appearance to resemble Fuuka, who she greatly admired.

Media

Manga

Written and illustrated by Koji Seo, Fuuka was serialized in Kodansha's shōnen manga magazine Weekly Shōnen Magazine from February 12, 2014 to April 4, 2018. Its 195 individual chapters were compiled into twenty tankōbon volumes, released from May 16, 2014 to April 17, 2018. A Fuuka Special Edition volume was published on April 13, 2018 and contains alternative endings for other heroines.

The manga was simul-published online in English by Crunchyroll starting in 2014 and Kodansha USA starting in 2016. It was released in digital volumes by Kodansha USA from 2015 to 2019.

Anime
An anime television series adaptation produced by Diomedéa aired from 6 January to 24 March 2017. The series' opening theme is "Climbers' High!" by Manami Numakura who voices Tama, vocalist of the band Hedgehogs. The series' ending theme is "Watashi no Sekai" by Megumi Nakajima. The anime ran for 12 episodes and was released across six BD/DVD volumes.

Crunchyroll has licensed the series in North America, with Funimation releasing a simuldub for the series. Songs in the anime are performed by My First Story's guitarist SHO, Ellegarden's drummer Hirotaka Takahashi, The Bonez's bassist T$UYO$HI and Takuro Iga, the series' music composer, playing the keyboard.

Episode list

Music
A soundtrack album titled Fuuka Sound Collection was released on 15 March 2017, containing all insert songs and soundtracks from the anime.

In Chapter 189 of the manga, "Hoshi no Furu Machi"'s lyrics from the anime was used, marking the first time the manga took elements from the anime.

To commemorate the end of the manga, Seo wrote the song "Wings of Light", performed by Lynn, who voiced Fuuka in the anime adaptation.

Sales
Volume 1 reached the 26th place on the weekly Oricon manga charts and, as of 25 May 2014, had sold 64,879 copies; volume 2 reached the 18th place on the chart and, as of 27 July 2014, had sold 73,193 copies; volume 3 reached the 28th place and, as of 26 October 2014, had sold 70,638 copies; volume 4 reached the 20th place and, as of 21 December 2014, had sold 51,164 copies; volume 5 reached the 12th place and, as of 22 February 2015, had sold 62,771 copies; volume 6 reached the 14th place and, as of 24 May 2015, had sold 69,659 copies; volume 7 reached the 17th place and, as of 26 July 2015, had sold 66,456 copies; volume 8 reached the 25th place and, as of 25 October 2015 had sold 61,372 copies; volume 9 reached the 25th place and, as of 20 December 2015, had sold 36,105 copies.

Notes

References

External links
Anime official website 
Manga official website  

2017 anime television series debuts
Crunchyroll anime
Drama anime and manga
Funimation
Kodansha manga
Music in anime and manga
Romance anime and manga
Shōnen manga
Works by Kōji Seo